Beach Patrol is a half-hour television series airing on truTV. The show features lifeguards and police working together to apprehend criminals and save lives.

Each of the program's four seasons have focused on a different city San Diego, Miami, Honolulu and Huntington Beach.

Format

The basic outline of the show was based on real life moments of lifeguard and other beach patrol work on rescues and arrests. Although there was not much of the footage featured in the show that involved arrests, most of the footage featured rescues and finding missing personnel. The show runs for 30 minutes. A Beach Patrol special called The Best of Beach Patrol ran for 60 minutes. It was only within the San Diego series. The show was originally created and developed in the mid-nineties for the Fox-TV Station Group (FTSP/Foxlab), the same outfit that brought the airwaves COPS and America's Most Wanted. Beach Patrol was the brainchild of an executive at the division who was looking for a companion show for COPS which, ironically, it became, a decade later on another cable network.

Status
Since 2008, no new episodes have premiered and only reruns have aired occasionally. It is currently unknown if any new episodes will premiere.

The show is currently running on Australian network One (Australian TV channel), and since January 2015, the Justice Network in the United States.

See also
Ocean Force
Lifeguard

External links
Beach Patrol: San Diego on IMDb
Beach Patrol: Miami Beach on IMDb

2000s American crime television series